Matt McKnight (born June 14, 1984) is a Canadian professional ice hockey player. He was selected by the Dallas Stars in the 9th round (280th overall) of the 2004 NHL Entry Draft.

McKnight is currently playing for the Bietigheim Steelers in the DEL in Germany. He previously played for the Lausitzer Füchse in the German 2nd Bundesliga from 2011 to 2013. He received 2016-17 DEL2 Regular Season Forward of the Year honors after leading the league in points (24 goals, 48 assists in 50 games).

In the 2020/2021 season of the DEL2 he was promoted to the DEL with the Bietigheim Steelers after the DEL2 championship and at the age of 37 he played for the first time in the highest German ice hockey class, the DEL

Achievements and Awards

 2003 Rogers-Wireless-Cup  Camrose Kodiaks
 2015 DEL2-championship
 2017 DEL2-best forward
 2017 DEL2-topscorer 
 2018 DEL2-championship
 2019 DEL2-best forward
 2019 DEL2-best player
 2019 DEL2-best assists
 2021 DEL2-championship

Career statistics

References

External links

1984 births
Living people
Canadian ice hockey centres
Dallas Stars draft picks
Las Vegas Wranglers players
Idaho Steelheads (ECHL) players
Ice hockey people from Alberta
People from the County of Paintearth No. 18
Minnesota Duluth Bulldogs men's ice hockey players
Camrose Kodiaks players
SC Bietigheim-Bissingen players
Lausitzer Füchse players
Canadian expatriate ice hockey players in Germany
Canadian expatriate ice hockey players in the United States